The 11th Gran Premio Ciudad de Buenos Aires was a  Formula Libre motor race held on 30 January 1955 at the Autódromo 17 de Octubre in Buenos Aires. The race was held over two heats of 30 laps, with the winner decided by aggregate time, and was won by Juan Manuel Fangio in a Mercedes-Benz W196. His teammate Stirling Moss was second and José Froilán González and Maurice Trintignant shared a Ferrari 625 for third place.

Classification

References

Buenos Aires Grand Prix
Buenos Aires Grand Prix
Buenos Aires Grand Prix